The Pontypool Free Press is an English language weekly regional newspaper that was originally published in Pontypool, as the Pontypool Free Press and Herald of the Hills, in 1859 and is circulated in Pontypool and the surrounding area of Torfaen, in south-east Wales.

History

The Pontypool Free Press and Herald of the Hills was established in 1859, with the first edition on 5 March 1859. It was printed and published in Pontypool, in English, by the proprietor David Walkinshaw.
In 1877 Henry Hughes Junior agreed to purchase the paper, along with the Pontypool Local Register and the Pontypool Almanack, for £1,000 from Walkinshaw.

The name of the newspaper changed on 5 July 1879, to The Pontypool Free Press, and on 2 April 1909 to The Free Press of Monmouthshire.

In the 1980s, Don Touhig, later to become the Member of Parliament for Islwyn and a life peer, was editor of the newspaper. Touhig worked on the paper from 1968 to 1994, starting as a journalist, and ending as general manager of the Free Press Group.

An edition covering Chepstow was added in 1980, with other editions added later, giving four titles produced by the Free Press Group:

Abergavenny Free Press
Chepstow Free Press
Monmouth Free Press
Pontypool Free Press

In 1997 the Bailey Newspaper Group, the then owners of the Free Press Group, was bought by Southern Newspapers, based in Southampton. In 1998 Southern Newspapers changed its name to Newscom and, in 2000, was bought by the Newsquest Media Group.

Current owners

In November 2008 Newsquest Media (Southern) Ltd merged the Abergavenny, Chepstow, and Monmouth editions  into one edition covering Monmouthshire called The Free Press. The Pontypool Free Press continued as a separate edition.

In November 2011 Newsquest moved the editorial staff to its regional headquarters, at the offices of the South Wales Argus, in Newport, closing its offices in Pontypool and Chepstow. Soon after, Torfaen County Borough Council offered the paper an office at the Pontypool Civic Centre, and journalists now use the office as a drop-in centre every Friday.

The paper maintains a close relationship with the local rugby club, Pontypool RFC, as "Official Media Partner".

The paper is part of a group of papers covering some of south-east Wales, including the South Wales Argus, Penarth Times, and the Penarth & District News. The papers are all based at Cardiff Road, Maesglas, Newport NP20 3QN, with Kevin Ward as Regional Managing Editor and Nicole Garnon as Deputy Editor. The paper is currently released as a tabloid and in 2013 had an average circulation of 5,022 (including The Free Press) with a cover price of £0.40.

Archives

Paper, and microfiche, archives of the Pontypool Free Press and The Free Press of Monmouthshire are held at Gwent Archives, Ebbw Vale and Newport Central Library.

An online digital archive of the paper (1859–1869 and 1872–1893) is available from Welsh Newspapers Online.

Notes

References

External links
 Free Press - online version of Pontypool Free Press and Monmouthshire Free Press
 Pontypool Free Press and Herald of the Hills - online archive from National Library of Wales

Newspapers published in Wales
Newspapers published by Newsquest
Newspapers established in 1859
1859 establishments in Wales
Pontypool